Soala Ibiapuye Martyns-Yellowe was elected Senator for the Rivers West constituency of Rivers State, Nigeria at the start of the Nigerian Fourth Republic, running on the People's Democratic Party (PDP) platform. He took office on 29 May 1999.
He was reelected in April 2003.

Martyns-Yellowe was born on 12 November 1945 in Bakana, Degema Local Government Area, Rivers State.
He qualified as a neuro-psychiatrist, and served as chief medical director of the Rivers State Psychiatric Hospital, Rumuigbo, Port Harcourt.
After taking his seat in the Senate in June 1999 he was appointed to committees on Drug & Narcotics, Petroleum (Chairman) and Health.
In 2007, he was a contender in the PDP primary election to be candidate for Rivers State governor.
He died in Abuja on 2 July 2009 after a severe asthmatic attack.

References

Members of the Senate (Nigeria) from Rivers State
1945 births
2009 deaths
Rivers State Peoples Democratic Party politicians
Deaths from asthma
People from Degema
Peoples Democratic Party members of the Senate (Nigeria)
20th-century Nigerian politicians
21st-century Nigerian politicians